Long Is the Road is a 1948 German drama film directed by Herbert B. Fredersdorf and Marek Goldstein and starring Israel Becker, Bettina Moissi and Berta Litwina. The story examines the Holocaust from the perspective of a Polish Jewish family and a young man who is able to escape while he is transported to a concentration camp. The film was made during the summer of 1947. It was the first German-made film to directly portray the Holocaust (Morituri was released earlier but made later). It was made with the support of the US Army Information Control Division. It was partly shot at the Bavaria Studios in Munich with sets designed by the art director Carl Ludwig Kirmse.

A major aim of the film was to lobby for Jewish survivors still living in Displaced Persons (DP) camps to be allowed to emigrate to the British Mandate of Palestine. It drew a comparison between the plight of the Jewish population and the sufferings of other Europeans who had ended up in DP camps. This was partly done through the principal character's romantic relationship with Dora, a Jewish holocaust survivor.
The film employs a semi-documentary technique to tell its story. Many of its themes were similar to other German rubble films of the era, but it was notably different partly because of its advocacy of an optimistic, idealistic new world in Palestine. The film only ever went on a limited release, and by the time it received its German première, many inhabitants of the DP camps had been re-settled, with large numbers emigrating to the newly founded state of Israel.

Cast
 Israel Becker as David Jelin
 Bettina Moissi as Dora Berkowicz
 Berta Litwina as Hanne Jelin
 Jakob Fischer as Jakob Jelin
 Otto Wernicke as Senior Doctor
 Paul Dahlke as 2nd Doctor
 Aleksander Bardini as Peasant
 David Hart as Mr. Liebermann
 Misha Natan as Partisan
 Heinz-Leo Fischer as Chodetzki

References

Bibliography
 Shandley, Robert R. Rubble Films: German Cinema in the Shadow of the Third Reich. Temple University Press, 2001.

External links

 DVD 2016 : in Trésor du cinéma Yiddish

1948 films
1948 drama films
German drama films
West German films
1940s German-language films
1940s Polish-language films
Yiddish-language films
Films about Nazi Germany
Films set in the 1940s
Holocaust films
Films directed by Herbert B. Fredersdorf
Films with screenplays by Karl Georg Külb
German black-and-white films
1940s multilingual films
German multilingual films
1940s German films
Films shot at Bavaria Studios